The National Board of Review Award for Best Adapted Screenplay is an annual film award given (since 2003) by the National Board of Review of Motion Pictures. The years in the table indicate the evaluated films years, the award ceremonies took place in the following year.

2000s

2010s

2020s

See also
Academy Award for Best Adapted Screenplay

References

National Board of Review Awards
Screenwriting awards for film
Awards established in 2003
2003 establishments in the United States